The accessory meningeal artery (also accessory branch of middle meningeal artery, pterygomeningeal artery, small meningeal or parvidural branch) is a branch of the maxillary artery, sometimes derived from the middle meningeal artery.

Course
It enters the skull through the foramen ovale, and supplies the trigeminal ganglion and dura mater.

Nomenclature
Only about 10% of the blood flowing through this artery reaches intracranial structures.   The remaining blood flow is dispersed to extracranial structures around the infratemporal fossa.

Reflecting this fact, Terminologia Anatomica lists entries for both "accessory branch of middle meningeal artery" and "pterygomeningeal artery".

References

External links
 
 

Arteries of the head and neck